Gutt may refer to:

People

Abraham Gutt (born 1944), Israeli basketball player
 Camille Gutt (1884-1971), Belgian economist
Fred E. Gutt (1919-2012), American World War II flying ace
Golan Gutt (born 1994), Israeli basketball player
 Jeff Gutt (born 1976), American musician, lead vocalist for Stone Temple Pilots
Romuald Gutt (1888-1974), Polish architect
 Simone Gutt (born 1956), Belgian mathematician

Other
 Captain Gutt, a fictional Gigantopithecus from the animated film Ice Age: Continental Drift
 Gutt (Transformers), a fictional crime lord

See also

 Gut (disambiguation)